Central Germany (Zentraldeutschland/Mitteldeutschland), in geography, describes the areas surrounding the geographical centre of Germany.

Hesse, Saxony-Anhalt and Thuringia are the only landlocked German states without an international border except for the city-states of Berlin and Hamburg.

Geographical centre
The central point shifted several times during the country's eventful history. Today Niederdorla in the state of Thuringia claims to be the most central municipality in Germany. A plaque was erected and a lime tree planted at  after the 1990 German reunification. The point was confirmed as the centroid of the extreme coordinates by the Dresden University of Technology. Other municipalities competing are Krebeck in Lower Saxony and Edermünde in Hesse, as well as the village of Landstreit near Eisenach.

The geographical centre of the German Empire from 1871 to 1919 was located at Spremberg in the Prussian Province of Brandenburg. The centroid of East Germany until 1990 was located between the villages of Verlorenwasser and Weitzgrund near Belzig.

Topography
The German Central Uplands (Mittelgebirgsschwelle) is the Mittelgebirge area of low mountains and hills, comprising numerous individual ranges like the Rhenish Massif, the Lower Saxon Hills, the West and East Hesse Highlands, the Harz and the Thuringian-Franconian Highlands as well as the Bohemian Massif - in between the North German Plain and the Main river separating it from the South German Scarplands. The Thuringian Basin forms one of the core regions.

See also
 Central German
 Central Germany (cultural area), often an area within the modern states of Saxony, Saxony-Anhalt and Thuringia

References

Regions of Germany
Germany